The eighth season of German television series Alarm für Cobra 11 – Die Autobahnpolizei aired between September 5, 2002, and April 10, 2003. It follows a two-man team of Autobahnpolizei (highway police) in the area of Cologne in North Rhine-Westphalia.

Cast
 René Steinke as Tom Kranich
 Erdoğan Atalay as Semir Gerkhan

Steinke departed the cast after the end of the season.

Episodes

2002 German television seasons
2003 German television seasons